Roberta Lepper (born 11 September 1978) is a Fijian sailor. She competed in the Europe event at the 1996 Summer Olympics.

References

1978 births
Living people
People from Labasa
Fijian female sailors (sport)
Olympic sailors of Fiji
Sailors at the 1996 Summer Olympics – Europe
20th-century Fijian women
21st-century Fijian women